Coleophora centaureivora is a moth of the family Coleophoridae. It is found in France and Spain.

The larvae feed on the leaves of Centaurea aspera.

References

centaureivora
Moths described in 1998
Moths of Europe